John Gilmore may refer to: John Gilmore (activist) (born 1955), co-founder of the Electronic Frontier Foundation and Cygnus Solutions
 John Gilmore (musician) (1931–1995), American jazz saxophonist
 John Gilmore (representative) (1780–1845), Pennsylvania politician
 John Gilmore (tenor) (1950–1994), American operatic tenor
 John Gilmore (writer) (1935–2016), American true crime writer, author of Hollywood memoirs, and novelist
 John C. Gilmore (1837–1922), American Civil War soldier
 John S. Gilmore, American sociologist
 John Gilmore (American football) (John H. Gilmore, born 1979), American football player
 John W. Gilmore (1872–1942), American agronomist, educator and academic administrator

See also
 John Gilmour (disambiguation)
 Gilmore (surname)
 John Gilmore Riley House, historic house in Florida